Dieter Daniel Villalpando Pérez (born 4 August 1991) is a Mexican professional footballer who plays as a midfielder for Liga MX club Atlético San Luis.

On November 4, 2020, Villalpando was permanently expelled from Chivas FC due to sexual assault allegations against him and his teammates Javier Eduardo López, Alexis Francisco Peña and José Juan Vázquez.

Honours
Necaxa
Copa MX: Clausura 2018
Supercopa MX: 2018

References

External links

 

1991 births
Living people
Mexican footballers
Association football midfielders
Tampico Madero F.C. footballers
Murciélagos FC footballers
C.F. Pachuca players
Tigres UANL footballers
Atlético Morelia players
Atlas F.C. footballers
Chiapas F.C. footballers
Club Necaxa footballers
C.D. Guadalajara footballers
Liga MX players
Liga Premier de México players
Tercera División de México players
Footballers from Mexico City